Michael Earl Russow (born November 9, 1976) is a retired American professional mixed martial artist who competed in the Heavyweight division. Having made his professional debut in 1998, Russow has formerly competed for the UFC, Adrenaline MMA, PRIDE FC, and also participated in the Yarennoka! event in the Saitama Super Arena in Japan. He is perhaps best known for his upset victory over Todd Duffee.

Mixed martial arts career

Background
Russow is from Kankakee, Illinois and was a state wrestling champion in high school for the Heavyweight division. He also attended college at Eastern Illinois University and earned a degree in sociology. His first fight was in 1998.

Ultimate Fighting Championship
Russow signed with the UFC in 2009 and made his debut against Justin McCully at UFC 102. He won via unanimous decision (29–28, 30–26, and 30–27).

Russow then defeated Todd Duffee via third round KO at UFC 114. Russow absorbed heavy punishment from Duffee during the course of the fight but hung on late into the third and final round. Russow then connected with a hard straight right hand, taking Duffee and the fans in attendance by surprise.

Russow defeated TUF 10 alum and DeathClutch teammate Jon Madsen on March 26, 2011 at UFC Fight Night 24 via TKO; with that win he improved his winning streak to ten.

Russow was expected to face Dave Herman on October 8, 2011 at UFC 136.  However, the bout was cancelled after Herman failed his preliminary drug test in which he tested positive for marijuana.

Russow faced John Olav Einemo on January 28, 2012 at UFC on Fox: Evans vs. Davis and won via unanimous decision (29–28, 29–28, and 30–27).

Russow faced Fabrício Werdum on June 23, 2012 at UFC 147. Russow was defeated by Werdum via TKO at 2:28 of round 1.

Russow faced Shawn Jordan on January 26, 2013 at UFC on Fox: Johnson vs. Dodson. Despite a strong first round, Russow lost to Jordan by TKO in the second round and was subsequently released from the promotion.

World Series of Fighting 
On October 6, 2013 it was announced that Russow has signed with World Series of Fighting.

Since his signing with WSOF, Russow retired from MMA.

Personal life
Russow and his wife have a daughter. Russow is also a police officer in his hometown of Chicago.

Championships and accomplishments

Mixed martial arts
Ultimate Fighting Championship
Knockout of the Night (One time) vs. Todd Duffee

Amateur wrestling
National Junior College Athletic Association
NJCAA All-American (1997)
Illinois High School Association
IHSA Class AA High School State Championship (1995)
IHSA Class AA High School State Championship 3rd Place (1993, 1994)
IHSA Class AA All-State (1993, 1994, 1995)

Mixed martial arts record

|-
| Loss
|align=center| 15–3 (1)
| Shawn Jordan
| TKO (punches)
| UFC on Fox: Johnson vs. Dodson
| 
|align=center| 2
|align=center| 3:48
|Chicago, Illinois, United States 
| 
|-
| Loss
|align=center| 15–2 (1)
| Fabrício Werdum
| TKO (punches)
| UFC 147
| 
|align=center| 1
|align=center| 2:28
|Belo Horizonte, Minas Gerais, Brazil
|
|-
| Win
|align=center| 15–1 (1)
| John-Olav Einemo
| Decision (unanimous)
| UFC on Fox: Evans vs. Davis
| 
|align=center| 3
|align=center| 5:00
|Chicago, Illinois, United States
|
|-
| Win
|align=center| 14–1 (1)
| Jon Madsen
| TKO (doctor stoppage)
| UFC Fight Night: Nogueira vs. Davis
| 
|align=center| 2
|align=center| 5:00
|Seattle, Washington, United States
|
|-
| Win
|align=center| 13–1 (1)
| Todd Duffee
| KO (punch)
| UFC 114
| 
|align=center| 3
|align=center| 2:33
|Las Vegas, Nevada, United States
|
|-
| Win
|align=center| 12–1 (1)
| Justin McCully
| Decision (unanimous)
| UFC 102
| 
|align=center| 3
|align=center| 5:00
|Portland, Oregon, United States
|
|-
| Win
|align=center| 11–1 (1)
| Braden Bice
| Submission (north-south choke)
| Adrenaline MMA 2: Miletich vs. Denny
| 
|align=center| 1
|align=center| 1:13
|Moline, Illinois, United States
|
|-
| Win
|align=center| 10–1 (1)
| Jason Guida
| Submission (guillotine choke)
| Adrenaline MMA: Guida vs. Russow
| 
|align=center| 1
|align=center| 2:13
|Hoffman Estates, Illinois, United States
|
|-
| Win
|align=center| 9–1 (1)
| Roman Zentsov
| Submission (north-south choke)
| Yarennoka!
| 
|align=center| 1
|align=center| 2:58
|Saitama, Saitama, Japan
|
|-
| Win
|align=center| 8–1 (1)
| Steve Campbell
| Submission (arm-triangle choke)
| XFO 21
| 
|align=center| 2
|align=center| 4:32
|Lakemoor, Illinois, United States
|
|-
| Win
|align=center| 7–1 (1)
| Pat Harmon
| KO (punch)
| Bourbon Street Brawl 4
| 
|align=center| 1
|align=center| 2:10
|Chicago, Illinois, United States
|
|-
| Win
|align=center| 6–1 (1)
| Demian Decorah
| Submission (kimura)
| XFO 18
| 
|align=center| 1
|align=center| 2:54
|Wisconsin Dells, Wisconsin, United States
|
|-
| Win
|align=center| 5–1 (1)
| Scott Harper
| Submission (americana)
| XFO 16
| 
|align=center| 1
|align=center| 0:32
|Lakemoor, Illinois, United States
|
|-
| Loss
|align=center| 4–1 (1)
| Sergei Kharitonov
| Submission (armbar)
| Pride 33
| 
|align=center| 1
|align=center| 3:46
|Las Vegas, Nevada, United States
|
|-
| Win
|align=center| 4–0 (1)
| Steve Conkel
| Submission (rear-naked choke)
| Bourbon Street Brawl 2
| 
|align=center| 1
|align=center| 1:00
|Chicago, Illinois, United States
|
|-
| Win
|align=center| 3–0 (1)
| Chris Harrison
| Submission (americana)
| XFO 14
| 
|align=center| 1
|align=center| 1:11
|Lakemoor, Illinois, United States
|
|-
| Win
|align=center| 2–0 (1)
| Brandon Quigley
| KO (punches)
| Combat: Do Fighting Challenge 7
| 
|align=center| 1
|align=center| 0:18
|Cicero, Illinois, United States
|
|-
| NC
|align=center| 1–0 (1)
| Ed Meyer
| NC
| Combat: Do Fighting Challenge 6
| 
|align=center| N/A
|align=center| N/A
|Mokena, Illinois, United States
|
|-
| Win
|align=center| 1–0
| Nate Schroeder
| Decision (unanimous)
| JKD: Challenge 1
| 
|align=center| 3
|align=center| 5:00
|Chicago, Illinois, United States
|

References

External links

Official UFC Profile

1976 births
Living people
American male mixed martial artists
Heavyweight mixed martial artists
Mixed martial artists utilizing collegiate wrestling
Sportspeople from Chicago
Mixed martial artists from Illinois
Chicago Police Department officers
American male sport wrestlers
Sportspeople from Kankakee, Illinois
People from Alexandria, Minnesota
Ultimate Fighting Championship male fighters